Peter Michael Coleman Courtney (born June 18, 1943) is an American politician, lawyer, and professor who was a Democratic member of the Oregon State Senate, representing the 11th District (in Marion County and including parts of Salem, Woodburn, and Gervais) since 1999. He served as President of the Senate from 2003 to 2023. He was a member of the Oregon House of Representatives in 1981, 1983, and from 1989 through 1998. Courtney previously taught at Western Oregon University.

Early life
Courtney was born in Philadelphia, Pennsylvania, on June 18, 1943. He grew up in Moorestown, New Jersey, West Virginia, Rhode Island, and Virginia, the son of a life insurance agent. Both his parents earned college degrees, with his mother’s degree in Latin. In high school, he played on the school’s football team. Courtney attended college at the University of Rhode Island where he earned a bachelor's degree in political science in 1965 and a master’s in public administration the following year. He graduated from Boston University’s law school, and then moved to Oregon in 1969 to become the law clerk of William S. Fort of the Oregon Court of Appeals. Courtney arrived in Salem and stayed at the YMCA for two years.

Political career
Courtney's first political office was as a member of the Salem City Council where he served from 1974 until 1980. He was first elected to the Oregon Legislative Assembly in 1980 as a Democrat representing Marion and Polk counties in the Oregon House of Representatives.

Courtney gave up his House seat to run for the U.S. House of Representatives, 5th district, in the 1984 primary.  Courtney narrowly lost to state senator Ruth McFarland, who had been the 1982 nominee. McFarland again lost to Congressman Denny Smith.  Courtney ran for and narrowly lost a state Senate seat in 1986, before taking back his old state House seat in 1988. In the House he served as Democratic leader for eight years, longer than anyone else had before him. After repairs to the Oregon State Capitol were finished in 1995 after damage from the 1993 Scotts Mills earthquake, he gave a small piece of marble with an engraved image of the building to each Democrat in the House. He served as minority leader during the 1997 session.

He avoided term limits by moving from the House to the Senate in 1999, representing only Marion County. In 2002, he had surgery to remove a burst appendix and even received last rites prior to the surgery when survival was unknown. After 13 days at the hospital he recovered and returned to the legislature.

In 2003, Courtney was selected as the President of the Oregon State Senate. The Senate was evenly divided between the state's major parties at the time, with 15 Democrats and 15 Republicans. Republican Lenn Hannon was chosen as President Pro-tem; the two were recognized as having forged a strong bipartisan working relationship during the previous legislature's five emergency sessions. Courtney is the longest-serving legislator and Senate President in Oregon's history. His support and advocacy in animal-related measures saw him labeled as a 2011 "Top Dog" by the Oregon Humane Society. In January 2022, Courtney announced he would not seek reelection to the Oregon Senate.

Courtney served as co-chair of the Legislative Counsel Committee, the Legislative Policy and Research Committee, and the Legislative Administrative Committee.

Career and family
Courtney taught speech at Western Oregon University, and served as an administrator at the Monmouth school. He married Margie (née Brenden) Courtney in 1976; they have three sons.

He has worked as a political commentator for KPTV television and KSLM (now KZGD, as of 2020) radio. Courtney appeared in the documentary film Running Forward: Conquering Oregon's Hood to Coast Relay, that was released in 2011.  He has served on several boards of directors, and is a member of the Oregon State Bar.

References

External links

Oregon State Senate - Senate President Peter Courtney
Project Vote Smart - Senator Peter C. Courtney (OR) profile
Follow the Money 2008
Nov. 7, 2006 Voters' Pamphlet General Election from the Oregon Secretary of State
Peter Courtney and the No-Bid Capitol Makeover Willamette Week, July 11, 2007

1943 births
21st-century American politicians
Boston University School of Law alumni
Lawyers from Salem, Oregon
Living people
Democratic Party members of the Oregon House of Representatives
Oregon city council members
Politicians from Trenton, New Jersey
Politicians from Salem, Oregon
Presidents of the Oregon State Senate
Democratic Party Oregon state senators
University of Rhode Island alumni
Western Oregon University faculty